The Csanád County or Chanad County or  was a county of the Kingdom of the medieval Kingdom of Hungary. It was established after Csanád (the eponymous founder) had defeated Ajtony, and the bishopric of Csanád was founded in the 11th century.

History

It was established after Magyar nobleman Csanád (the eponymous founder) had defeated Ajtony, who had ruled over the region now known as Banat (in Romania and Serbia). At urbs Morisena, which was given the name of Csanád, a Roman Catholic bishopric was immediately founded, headed by Gerard. By that time Csanád had been baptized and become the head of the royal county (comitatus) organized around the fortress at Csanád.

Since 1526, the county was controlled by the Eastern Hungarian Kingdom. During the Ottoman campaign in 1551-1552, the county was conquered and its territory was incorporated into the newly formed Sanjak of Çanad, within the Temeşvar Eyalet.

See also
 Banat in the Middle Ages
 Sanjak of Çanad

References

Sources

 
 
 
 
 
 

States and territories established in the 11th century
Counties of the Kingdom of Hungary in the Middle Ages
States and territories disestablished in 1552
History of Banat